Ottomar Johann Friedrich Meykow (7 January 1823 – 5 February 1894) was a Baltic German legal scholar, 1876–1881 and 1890–1892 rector of the University of Tartu.

He studied at the University of Tartu, 1847 mag. iur. and 1850 dr. iur. Since 1857 he taught at the university.

References

1823 births
1894 deaths
Baltic-German people
Legal scholars
University of Tartu alumni
Academic staff of the University of Tartu
Rectors of the University of Tartu
People from Tartu